Mario "Maka" Ivanković (born 8 February 1975) is a Bosnian and Croatian professional football manager and former player who is the head coach of the Bosnia and Herzegovina U19 national team.

Playing career
Ivanković had a season in the 2. Bundesliga with Chemnitzer FC. He totalled 210 official matches in all competitions for Zrinjski, which placed him second behind Pero Stojkić and just ahead of Velibor Đurić on the club's all-time appearances list.

Managerial statistics

Honours

Player
Neretva
2. HNL: 1993–94 (South)

Suwon Samsung Bluewings 
Korean FA Cup: 2002
AFC Champions League: 2001–02
Asian Super Cup: 2001, 2002

Nejmeh
Lebanese Premier League: 2004–05
Lebanese Super Cup: 2004
Lebanese Elite Cup: 2004

Zrinjski Mostar
Bosnian Premier League: 2008–09
Bosnian Cup: 2007–08

Individual
Zrinjski Mostar Player of the Season 2007–08 by supporters

References

External links
Mario Ivanković at Sofascore

1975 births
Living people
Croats of Bosnia and Herzegovina
Association football defenders
Bosnia and Herzegovina footballers
Croatian footballers
Croatia youth international footballers
Croatia under-21 international footballers
NK Neretva players
NK Varaždin players
HŠK Zrinjski Mostar players
NK Široki Brijeg players
Chemnitzer FC players
Suwon Samsung Bluewings players
Nejmeh SC players
NK Brotnjo players
First Football League (Croatia) players
Croatian Football League players
2. Bundesliga players
K League 1 players
Premier League of Bosnia and Herzegovina players
Lebanese Premier League players
First League of the Federation of Bosnia and Herzegovina players
Bosnia and Herzegovina expatriate footballers
Croatian expatriate footballers
Expatriate footballers in Germany
Bosnia and Herzegovina expatriate sportspeople in Germany
Croatian expatriate sportspeople in Germany
Expatriate footballers in South Korea
Bosnia and Herzegovina expatriate sportspeople in South Korea
Croatian expatriate sportspeople in South Korea
Expatriate footballers in Lebanon
Bosnia and Herzegovina expatriate sportspeople in Lebanon
Croatian expatriate sportspeople in Lebanon
Bosnia and Herzegovina football managers
Croatian football managers